Cătălina Gheorghițoaia (born 19 June 1975) is a Romanian sabre fencer, team silver medallist in the 2001 World Fencing Championships. She competed at the 2004 Summer Olympics, placing fourth after being defeated by Mariel Zagunis, then Sada Jacobson.

References

External links
 

1975 births
Living people
Romanian female sabre fencers
Olympic fencers of Romania
Fencers at the 2004 Summer Olympics
Sportspeople from Bucharest